Stossel was a weekly American talk show, hosted by John Stossel, highlighting current consumer issues with a libertarian viewpoint. The television program debuted on December 10, 2009, on the Fox Business Network and aired on Fridays. It originally aired at 8:00 pm EST, but was moved to 9:00 pm EST. In 2013, Fox News Channel began to replay the show which aired occasionally on the weekends.

John Stossel moderated the first-ever nationally televised Libertarian presidential debate on April 1, 2016. The second part of the debate aired on April 8.

The final episode premiered on December 16, 2016. At the end of that episode, a retrospective that spotlighted moments from seven years of the program, Stossel explained that due to his age, he wanted to help develop a younger generation of journalists with his views, and would continue to appear as a guest on Fox programs, and also help produce content for Reason TV.

Format

Each show was filmed before a studio audience and edited to fit the hour-long format. Experts were brought in from both sides to discuss the issues with Stossel, who sometimes played devil's advocate with the guests whose views mirrored his own. Episodes also included segments filmed outside the studio. At the end of each show, the studio audience was allowed to ask questions of some of the guests.

Beginning with the August 5, 2010, show, Fox Business renovated and expanded the Stossel studio.

Episode list

Season 1: 2009–2010

Season 2: 2011

Season 3: 2012

Season 4: 2013

Season 5: 2014

Season 6

Season 7

References

External links
 

2009 American television series debuts
2016 American television series endings
2000s American television talk shows
2010s American television talk shows
Political mass media in the United States
English-language television shows
Fox Business original programming
Libertarian television and radio shows
Libertarianism in the United States